= University of Technology and Business =

Coordinates: 40°25′20.3″N 3°42′21.26″W

- Type: Private
- Established: June 7, 2009; 17 years ago
- Endowment: US$ 63,400,789
- Academic staff: 8000
- Administrative staff: 116
- Location: Madrid, Spain
- Campus: Madrid and Toledo
- Colors: Blue and Black
- Website: www.unitye.es

The University of Technology and Business (Universidad Tecnología y Empresa) was a private university in Madrid, Spain with campuses in both Madrid and Toledo.

As of 2015, the university offered forty-six bachelor's degrees and, through the Leadership School of Thought graduate program, twenty-three master's degrees and five doctorates.

== History ==
The university originated in ETEA, the Faculty of Economic and Business Sciences of Córdoba, a higher education centre founded in 1963. The establishment of the Universidad Tecnología y Empresa was approved by the Parliament of Spain on 23 November 2009. The first promotion enrolled in 2009.
